Anthrobia is a genus of North American dwarf spiders that was first described by T. Tellkampf in 1844.

Species
 it contains four species, all found in the United States:
Anthrobia acuminata (Emerton, 1913) – USA
Anthrobia coylei Miller, 2005 – USA
Anthrobia monmouthia Tellkampf, 1844 (type) – USA
Anthrobia whiteleyae Miller, 2005 – USA

See also
 List of Linyphiidae species

References

Araneomorphae genera
Linyphiidae
Spiders of the United States